Damaged may refer to:

Damaged (band)
Damaged (Black Flag album), 1981
Damaged (Course of Nature album), 2008
Damaged (Lambchop album), 2006
Damaged (EP), a 2007 split EP by Boris and Stupid Babies Go Mad
"Damaged" (Danity Kane song), 2008
"Damaged" (TLC song), 2003
"Damaged" (Arrow), 2012 episode of Arrow
"Damaged", an episode of the British television sitcom After You've Gone

See also
Damage (disambiguation)